Epicephala ancistropis is a moth of the family Gracillariidae. It is known from Java, Indonesia.

The larvae feed on Callicarpa candicans. They probably mine the leaves of their host plant.

References

Epicephala
Moths described in 1935